Watkin Wynne (11 May 1844 – 8 July 1921) was an Australian journalist, local government councillor, local government head and newspaper owner. Wynne was born in Black Notley, Essex, England and died in Waverley, Sydney, New South Wales.

See also

References

Australian journalists
New South Wales local councillors
Australian Anglicans
Australian Presbyterians
1844 births
1921 deaths
People from Black Notley
English emigrants to Australia